Stephen Kenneth Cumberbatch (1909-2011) was an eminent West Indian Anglican priest.

Cumberbatch was educated at  Codrington College, Barbados and ordained in 1942. After a curacy at St. John's Cathedral, Antigua he was Priest in charge at St. Mary on the same island. He held Incumbencies at Stann Creek, St Patrick Tobago, Sangre Grande, Tacarigua, San Fernando and Port of Spain before his appointment as Archdeacon in 1969.

Notes

1909 births
2011 deaths
Alumni of Codrington College
Archdeacons of Trinidad, North and South
Trinidad and Tobago religious leaders